Lady Anne Moulson (sometimes Ann and/or Mowlson), born Anne Radcliffe (sometimes Radclyffe) (1576–1661), was an early benefactor of the fledgling colonial Harvard College. She is remembered today in the name of Radcliffe College.

Ann Radcliffe was the daughter of Anthony Radcliffe of London (died 1603) and Elizabeth Bright. In 1600 she was married to Thomas Moulson, an alderman and member of the Grocers' Company who served as Lord Mayor of London in 1634. They owned and operated an inn in London. They had two children but both died young. Thomas Moulson died in 1638, leaving the customary half of his estate to his widow Anne. Ann had a head for business and managed her own business for the next twenty-three years. In addition to the inn, she loaned money and invested in import ventures. She was also active in the Puritan cause, contributing toward hiring a Puritan lecturer in her parish and giving generously to other charities. In 1643 she donated some of her money to found the first endowed scholarship at Harvard. When in 1894 the women's annex to the university was chartered as a full college, it was given the name of Harvard's first female benefactor.

References

External links
 Jane S. Knowles, ‘Moulson , Ann, Lady Moulson (1576–1661)’, Oxford Dictionary of National Biography, online edn, Oxford University Press, Oct 2006. Retrieved 22 December 2006
Collection relating to Ann Radcliffe, 1894-1977. Schlesinger Library, Radcliffe Institute, Harvard University.

1576 births
1661 deaths
Harvard University people
Radcliffe College people
Ann
16th-century English women
17th-century English women